Édouard Vanzeveren (27 April 1905 – 12 May 1948) was a French freestyle swimmer. He competed at the 1924 Summer Olympics in the 100 m, 400 m and 4×200 m relay events, but failed to reach the finals.

References

External links 
 

1905 births
1948 deaths
French male freestyle swimmers
Swimmers at the 1924 Summer Olympics
Olympic swimmers of France